The Atlantic Shield is a large geological shield located in eastern South America. The shield is made up of the cratons of São Luís, São Francisco, Luís Alves and Río de la Plata.

References 

Cratons
Regions of South America
Geology of Argentina
Geology of Brazil
Geology of Uruguay
Geology of South America
Natural history of South America
Precambrian South America